Adam Piotr Kszczot (pronounced ; born 2 September 1989) is a retired Polish middle-distance runner, who specialized in the 800 metres. His achievements include a gold medal at the 2018 World Indoor Championships as well as silver medals at the 2014 World Indoor Championships, 2015 and 2017 World Championships in addition to multiple medals on European level. He twice competed at the Olympic Games, in 2012 and 2016, narrowly missing the final on both occasions.

Kszczot won 13 individual Polish titles (in- and outdoors, including two 1500 metres titles). He is the current Polish national record holder for the indoor 800 metres.

Personal life
Kszczot was born and raised in Opoczno by his parents, mother Ewa - a former mathematics teacher and father Stanisław Kszczot, a carpenter. He has two sisters, Agata and Ewa. His older brother Jacek died at age 17 as a result of electric shock during agricultural work. He graduated from the Lodz University of Technology in Management. In October 2014 he married Renata (nee Borkowska). In October 2017 his wife gave birth to their son named Ignacy.

Career
Kszczot reached the international level after competing in local and then national events. He won the bronze medal at the 2007 European Junior Championships, finished fourth at the 2008 World Junior Championships and won the 2009 European U23 Championships. He finished fourth at the 2009 European Indoor Championships and competed at the 2009 World Championships without reaching the final.

Kszczot won the bronze medal at the 2010 World Indoor Championships and the 2010 European Championships, as well as the gold at the 2011 European Indoor Championships. He reached the final at the 2011 World Championships, finishing sixth. His outdoor personal best is 1:43.30 minutes, achieved on 10 September 2011 in Rieti.

Kszczot broke Paweł Czapiewski's ten-year-old Polish indoor record at the 2012 Meeting Pas de Calais. His time of 1:44.57 made him the third fastest indoor runner ever after Wilson Kipketer and Yuriy Borzakovskiy. Vazel, Pierre-Jean (2012-02-15). With this result Kszczot went to the 2012 World Indoor Championships as a medal favourite. However, he finished a disappointing fourth. In his Olympic debut in London he placed third in his semifinal round, failing to qualify for the final.

He started well the 2013 season by successfully defending his title at the European Indoor Championships, the first man to do so in 42 years.

On August 15, 2014 he won the men’s 800m final at the 2014 European Athletics Championships with a time of 1:44:15 after a blistering last 100m sprint.

In 2017, he won the bronze medal in the men's 4 × 800 metres relay at the 2017 IAAF World Relays held in Nassau, Bahamas. He won the silver medal in the 800 metres at the 2017 World Championships held in London.

On March 3, 2018 Kszczot claimed his first title of World Indoor Champion in the 800 meters. He controlled the final run, the pace of which was quite slow and won with a large advantage over American Drew Windle and Spanish Saúl Ordóñez. He dedicated his gold medal to his 5-month-old son Ignacy. In August, Kszczot added the European outdoor title at the event.

Achievements

International competitions

Circuit wins
 Diamond League, 800 metres events
 2012: London
 2014: Stockholm, Brussels (1000m)
 2015: Zürich, Brussels
 2016: Brussels
 2017: Roma

References

External links

 
 
 
 
 

1989 births
Living people
Polish male middle-distance runners
Olympic athletes of Poland
Athletes (track and field) at the 2012 Summer Olympics
Athletes (track and field) at the 2016 Summer Olympics
European Athletics Championships medalists
People from Opoczno
Sportspeople from Łódź Voivodeship
World Athletics Championships athletes for Poland
World Athletics Championships medalists
European Athletics Championships winners
World Athletics Indoor Championships winners
Polish Athletics Championships winners
21st-century Polish people